The shortbelly catshark (Apristurus breviventralis)  is a catshark of the family Scyliorhinidae.  It is found in Gulf of Aden, Indian Ocean. This species most closely resembles the western Atlantic species Apristurus canutus, but is distinguishable in having greater nostril length than internarial width and longer claspers in adult males.

References

External links
Apristurus breviventralisKAWAUCHI, WEIGMANN & NAKAYA, 2014

shortbelly catshark
Gulf of Aden
Taxa named by Junro Kawauchi
Taxa named by Simon Weigmann
Taxa named by Kazuhiro Nakaya
shortbelly catshark